Lingxi is a town of Yongshun County, Hunan Province, China, and also the seat of Yongshun County, Hunan, China.

History 
Located in the central land of the county, the town was reformed by merging the former Lingxi Town and other four townships in which including Shaoha, Daba, Fuzhi and Diaojing on November 30, 2015. The town is divided into 45 villages and 12 communities. Its seat is Chengbei Community.

Etymology
Lingxi Town stands in the drainage basin of Lingxi River, it is named after the river. The river is the upper reaches of Niulu River, the largest tributary of Mengdong River, and Mengdong River is the largest tributary of You River.

See also 
 List of township-level divisions of Hunan

References

Divisions of Yongshun County
County seats in Hunan
Towns of Xiangxi Tujia and Miao Autonomous Prefecture